A Johnson Bar is a control lever on a steam locomotive, used to control the timing of the admission of steam into the locomotive's cylinders.  By controlling this timing, the amount of power delivered to the wheels is regulated, as is the direction that the wheels rotate, giving the lever the alternative name of the reversing lever. This is the term employed in British English, while the term 'Johnson Bar' is common in the United States. Its basically a reverser, but for steam locomotives.

History

Historians have not identified the reasons why engineers called the reversing lever a Johnson Bar, but the reversing lever is described in both British, and American railway journals of the time.  The best accreditation of the invention is documented under the Walschaerts valve gear.

Reversing

The reversing lever in locomotive history is documented from about 1842.  The American Railway Master Mechanic's Association had members that published illustrations.  Parts for the reversing lever are drawn in the "Locomotive Dictionary", 1st edition (1906), by George Little Fowler.  The lever is linked to the valve gear piston inside the high pressure steam port.  The steam pressure faucet is closed to cut off power, and after coming to a halt, the valve gear piston could safely be moved a short distance using the lever as a fulcrum linked to the piston inside. Although the linkage was designed to give leverage, the Johnson Bar would take a firm throw to move and lock in position.  Some locomotives had a screw reversing gear instead.

Steam cut-off

The other use of the lever is to set the point of steam cut-off.  This is measured as the percentage of the piston stroke during which live boiler steam is still being admitted to the cylinder.  For starting the locomotive (when maximum torque is required), "full" cut-off may be as high as 85%, meaning that the piston is subject to almost full boiler pressure throughout most of its stroke.  Conversely, when running at high speed and not accelerating or climbing a gradient, cut-off can be set to as low as 10%.  This reduces torque but greatly economises on fuel, since far less steam is supplied to the cylinder and it is more efficiently used, being more greatly expanded and thus exhausted at a much lower temperature than when working at full cut-off.  For steady-state running of most locomotives it is most efficient in terms of fuel and water to run with the throttle wide open and a short cut-off.

Limitations

The reversing lever has a catch mechanism which engages with a series of notches to hold the lever at the desired cut-off position. This means that the operator does not have a full choice of cut-off positions between maximum and mid-gear, but only those which correspond with the notches. The position of the notches is chosen by the locomotive designer or constructor with a view to the locomotive's intended purpose - in general engines designed for freight will have fewer notches with a 'longer' minimum cut-off (providing high tractive effort at low speeds but poor efficiency at high speeds) while a passenger locomotive will have more notches and a shorter minimum cut-off (allowing efficiency at high speeds at the expense of tractive effort). If the minimum cut-off provided for by the notches was too high it would not be possible to run the locomotive in the efficient way described above (with a fully open regulator) without leading to steam wastage or 'choking' of the steam passages, so the regulator would have to be closed, limiting efficiency. 

The Johnson Bar is effectively part of the entire valve gear, being connected to the various linkages and arms in order to serve its function in adjusting them. This means that the forces in the valve gear can be transmitted to the lever. This is especially the case if the engine has unbalanced slide valves, which have a high operating friction and are subject to steam forces on both sides of the valve. This friction meant that if the Johnson Bar is unlatched while the engine is operating under high steam pressure (wide regulator openings and high cut-off) or at high speeds, the forces that are supposed to act on the slide valves can instead be transmitted back through the linkage to the now-free reversing lever. This will suddenly and violently throw the lever into the full cut-off position, carrying with it the real danger of injury to the driver, damage to the valve gear and triggering wheelslip in the locomotive. 

The only way to prevent this is to close the regulator and allow the steam pressure in the valve chest to drop. The reversing lever can then be unlatched and set to a new cut-off position and then the regulator could be opened again. During this process the locomotive is not under power. On ascending gradients it was a matter of great skill to reduce the regulator opening by enough to safely unlatch the Johnson Bar while maintaining sufficient steam pressure to the cylinders. Each time the regulator was re-opened was a chance to encounter wheelslip and in loose coupled trains each closure and opening of the regulator set up dynamic forces throughout the length of the train which risked broken couplings. 

The screw reverser overcame all these issues. It provides infinite selection of cut-off between the valve gear's maximum and mid-gear and because it works by adjusting a heavy-duty screw thread, is never 'unlatched' even when the cut-off is being altered and thus transmitted no force to the control handle in normal use (in conditions of priming or wheelspin excessive force can generate enough force to rotate the wheel). The cut-off can be altered while the cylinders are receiving full steam pressure, allowing the regulator to be wide open as often as possible. The power reverser is a further refinement of the idea, being a servomechanism which remotely operates the valve gear by steam or compressed air, with no physical connection between the driver's reversing handle and the valve gear, and thus being free from any in-gear forces. 

The dangers of the traditional Johnson Bar (which grew as locomotive power, weight and operating steam pressures increased through the first half of the 20th century) led to it being banned in the USA by the Interstate Commerce Commission. From 1939 all new-build steam locomotives had to be fitted with power reversers and from 1942 Johnson Bar-fitted engines undergoing heavy overhaul or rebuilding had to be retro-fitted with power reverse. Exceptions existed for light, low-powered locomotives and switchers. For switching, which required frequent changes of direction from full-ahead to full-reverse gear, the Johnson Bar was favoured because the change could be made quickly in a single motion instead of the multiple turns of the handle of a low-geared screw reverser.

See also
 Lever
 Walschaerts valve gear

References

Greenly, H., "Walschaerts Valve Gear", Marshall
Danbury Railway Museum - Danbury, CT 
George L. Fowler, "Locomotive Dictionary", 1st edition (1906), University of Wisconsin Library
reversing lever

Locomotive parts
Steam locomotive technologies